The Young Women's Christian Association in Pueblo, Colorado is a historic YWCA building which was built in 1934.  It was listed on the National Register of Historic Places in 1980.

It is an L-shaped building designed by architect Walter DeMordaunt.

References

External links
Colorado Historical Society
Young Women's Christian Association of Pueblo - Project Photos

Cultural infrastructure completed in 1934
Clubhouses on the National Register of Historic Places in Colorado
YWCA buildings
National Register of Historic Places in Pueblo, Colorado
1934 establishments in Colorado
History of women in Colorado